Arnaud Mignardi (born 1 November 1986 in Auch, France) is a French rugby union footballer. He currently plays for Stade Montois in the Pro D2. He has previously played for CA Brive, ASM Clermont Auvergne, Biarritz Olympique and SU Agen. His usual position is at centre.

He first played professionally for FC Auch from 2004 to 2006 before he moved to SU Agen for the 2006-07 Top 14. He made his Test debut for France in 2007 – when he earned two caps during France's Test series against the All Blacks in New Zealand. He had previously played for France's Under 21 team in 2006.

Awards 
 France: 2 caps in 2007
 France U21s: 2006 Rugby World Championship
 France U19s: 3 selections in 2005 (Scotland, England, Wales)
 2009-10 Heineken Cup runners-up with Biarritz Olympique after defeat against Stade Toulousain, (21-19)

External links
 
 
 

1986 births
French rugby union players
Living people
Rugby union centres
France international rugby union players